Sounding Brass  a British comedy television series which originally aired on ITV in 1980.

Actors who appeared in individual episodes of the series include Bill Dean, Annie Hulley, Colin Douglas, John Flanagan, Carol Leader, Barbar Bhatti, Stan Richards and Harold Innocent.

Synopsis
The series concentrates on Horace Gilbert Bestwick, the new leader of the Ettaswell brass band.

Main cast
 Brian Glover as Horace Gilbert Bestwick
 Gwen Taylor as Cynthia Wildgoose
 Stephen Hancock as  Leonard Dukes
 Philip Jackson as Arthur Mannion
 Kevin Lloyd as Cyril Bacon
 Ray Mort as  Gerry Thompson
 Mark Curry as Tim Barker
 David Huscroft as Roger Forster
 Teddy Turner as  Frank Oldfield
 Alex McCrindle as  Mr. Mackenzie  
 Sandra Voe as  Mrs. Crowther
 Deirdre Costello as  Jean Gray
 Lorraine Peters as  Marjorie Taylor
 Paul Shane as  Gray
 Pamela Vezey as  Dorothy Thompson

References

External links
 

1980 British television series debuts
1980 British television series endings
1980s British comedy television series
ITV sitcoms
Television series by ITV Studios
Television shows produced by Associated Television (ATV)
English-language television shows